Andrea López Caballero (born 1647) was a Spanish painter. He was born in Naples, but studied in Madrid under José Antolínez. He devoted himself chiefly to portrait painting, though in Madrid is a picture of Christ with Virgin Mother and Mary Magdalen.

References

1647 births
Year of death missing
17th-century Spanish painters
Spanish male painters
Painters from Naples
Spanish Baroque painters